Juan Medina may refer to:
 Juan José Medina, former President of Paraguay
 Juan Medina Herrad (born 1992), Dominican boxer
 Juan Antonio Medina (born 1946), former Spanish handball player
 Juan Carlos Medina (born 1983), Mexican footballer
 Juan de Medina (1490–1547), Spanish theologian and Spain's ambassador to Rome
 Juan Pablo Medina (born 1976), American actor